Doug Berrie (14 December 1930 – April 2001) was a Scottish footballer who played as a full back for Dundee United and Forfar Athletic. Berrie joined United in 1946 from local side Stobswell, making his debut in December against Cowdenbeath in a Scottish Division B match. Featuring in a number of matches that season, Berrie re-signed for the following campaign, going on to make nearly 142 league appearances before his release in 1953. Joining Forfar, Berrie was granted a testimonial in 1961, which was played against United. Leaving Forfar in 1964, Berrie's son, also Doug, was a schoolboy signing at Tannadice in May 1970 but failed to make a first-team appearance.

References

1930 births
2001 deaths
Scottish footballers
Dundee United F.C. players
Forfar Athletic F.C. players
Dundee F.C. wartime guest players
Association football defenders
Scottish Football League players